The Weapon is an album by saxophonist David Newman featuring performances recorded in 1972 for the Atlantic label.

Reception

Allmusic awarded the album 3 stars stating "Despite its flaws and imperfections, The Weapon is recommended to those who like their jazz laced with a lot of R&B".

Track listing
 "Missy" (David Newman) - 5:29
 "Seems Like I Gotta Do Wrong" (Dee Ervin) - 4:22
 "You Can't Always Get What You Want" (Mick Jagger, Keith Richards) - 7:00
 "Yes We Can Can" (Allen Toussaint) - 3:51
 "Happy Times" (Toussaint, Cosimo Matassa) - 4:01
 "Drown in My Own Tears" (Henry Glover) - 4:37
 "Freedom for the Stallion" (Toussaint) - 3:25

Personnel 
David Newman - tenor saxophone, alto saxophone, flute
Mac Rebennack - piano, organ
Richard Tee - organ
Cornell Dupree, David Spinozza - guitar
Chuck Rainey - electric bass
Charles Collins, Jimmy Johnson, Bernard Purdie - drums
Ralph MacDonald - percussion
Unidentified string section conducted by Gene Orloff (tracks 2 & 7)
Ernie Royal (tracks 5 & 6), Joe Wilder (tracks 5 & 6), Wilmer Wise (track 3) - trumpet
Daniel Orlock - cornet (track 3)
Robert Moore - trombone (track 3)
Paul Ingraham - French horn (track 3)
Jonathan Dorn - tuba (track 3)
Frank Wess - alto saxophone (tracks 5 & 6)
Seldon Powell - tenor saxophone (tracks 5 & 6) 
The Sweet Inspirations: Jeanette Brown, Judy Clay, Myrna Smith, Sylvia Shemwell - backing vocals (tracks 2-4 & 7)

References 

1973 albums
David "Fathead" Newman albums
Albums produced by Joel Dorn
Atlantic Records albums